Anaithinthiya Thamizhaga Munnetra Kazhagam (All India Federation for the Progress of Tamilians), is a political party in Tamil Nadu, India. It is registered with the Election Commission of India, but still unrecognized.

References

Election Commission of India

Political parties in Tamil Nadu
Political parties with year of establishment missing